Legislative elections were held in Western Region in Nigeria in July 1960. The result was a victory for Action Group, which won 79 of the 122 seats.

Results

Sources

Regional elections in Nigeria
Western